KRVY-FM (97.3 FM, "97-3 The Kangaroo") is a variety hits formatted radio station serving Alexandria, Minnesota.

The station is licensed to the community of Starbuck, Minnesota, and owned by Iowa City Broadcasting Company, Inc.

On 11/1/19, KRVY began stunting with Christmas music under the branding "97.3 Happy Holidays." Previously, it ran an Adult Contemporary format for many years under the branding '97.3 the River', mostly through the Westwood One Adult Contemporary service besides the morning show.

On December 26, 2019, KRVY flipped to a Variety hits format branded as "The New 97.3 The Kangaroo."

References

External links
K-Music Radio

Radio stations in Alexandria, Minnesota
Radio stations established in 1997